Saturation (stylized in all caps) is the debut studio album by American boy band Brockhampton, released on June 9, 2017. It's part of the Saturation trilogy, together with Saturation II and III. It primarily features Brockhampton members Kevin Abstract, Merlyn Wood, Dom McLennon, Matt Champion, Russell "Joba" Boring, and former member Ameer Vann. Group member Bearface also contributes to the album's closing track. Production was primarily handled by Romil Hemnani and Q3—a production duo consisting of Jabari Manwa and Kiko Merley, with additional production contributions by Joba, Bearface, and Rome Gomez.

Critical reception 

Saturation received general acclaim from music critics upon its release. DJBooth's Brent Bradley praised the group's chemistry, noting that "With Saturation, Brockhampton has cemented themselves as a force to behold, the next in an all-too-short line of examples in which groups manage to fully realize their dynamic potential". For RadioUTD, Roman Soriano referred to the group's members as "highly talented", continuing that "it's incredible to think that this was put together in just three and a half weeks, given the complexity of this project", praising its "powerful lyricism, great storytelling, and ... cohesive but diverse sound". In a less positive review, Pitchfork's Matthew Strauss called the album a "split between effortless cool and empty platitudes", praising the group's stylishness and assertiveness, but criticizing the album's less aggressive moments as "sappy", revealing "the collective's lyrical weakness".

Year-end rankings

Track listing 

Notes
  signifies an additional producer.
  signifies an additional drum programmer.
 All tracks are stylised in all caps.

Personnel 
Brockhampton

 Kevin Abstract – performance (tracks 2–5, 7, 8, 10–13, 15), executive production, creative direction
 Ameer Vann – performance (tracks 1–5, 7, 8, 10, 12, 13, 15, 16) 
 Merlyn Wood – performance (tracks 1, 2, 4, 7, 11–13, 15)
 Dom McLennon – performance (tracks 1–4, 7, 8, 10–13, 15, 16)
 Matt Champion – performance (tracks 1, 2, 4, 12, 15, 16)
 Joba – performance (tracks 1, 2, 4, 10, 11, 13, 16), additional drum programming (track 12), additional vocals (tracks 7, 12), additional keys (track 16), co-executive production, mixing, mastering
 Bearface – performance (track 17), production (track 17)
 Romil Hemnani – production (tracks 1, 6, 9–15), additional production (tracks 4, 8), additional drum programming (track 2), co-executive production, recording engineering
 Q3 – production (tracks 2, 7), additional production (tracks 11, 15)
 Jabari Manwa – production (tracks 3, 4, 8), additional production (track 13), additional synth (track 1), performance (tracks 6, 9, 14)
 Kiko Merley – production (tracks 5, 16), additional production (track 10), performance (track 7)
 Henock Sileshi – creative direction, graphic design
 Ashlan Grey – photography
 Robert Ontenient – webmastering, performance (tracks 6, 9, 14)

Additional personnel
 Rome Gomez – additional production (track 17), additional vocals (track 17)
 Nick Lenzini – creative assistance
 Kevin Doan – creative assistance

Charts

References 

2017 debut albums
Empire Distribution albums
Brockhampton (band) albums